Max Christiansen (born 25 September 1996) is a German professional footballer who plays as a midfielder for 2. Bundesliga club Greuther Fürth.

Club career
A Flensburg native, Christiansen started playing football with local sides SV Adelby and Flensburg 08. In 2010, at the age of 13, he moved to the youth ranks of Holstein Kiel where he stayed only one year, though. He joined the football academy of Hansa Rostock, this included attending a private school.

Subsequently, he made his way through Rostock's youth teams and eventually got promoted to the first team, playing then in 3. Liga. He debuted on 29 March 2014 in a home match against Stuttgarter Kickers, playing 80 minutes as a starter. In the following Christiansen became a regular and attracted the attention of several top- and second-flight clubs.

In the next winter break, 2014–15, Rostock faced massive financial difficulties and had to acquire income through selling players. Christiansen moved to 2. Bundesliga club FC Ingolstadt for a transfer fee of believed to be €500,000 and signed a three-and-a-half-year contract until 2018.

Shortly after the end of the 2020–21 season SpVgg Greuther Fürth, newly promoted to the Bundesliga, announced the signing of Christiansen for the 2021–22 season. He joined on a free transfer and signed a contract until 2023.

International career
Christiansen was captain of the Germany U20 team and earned six caps. Previously he also was capped for the U19 and U17 teams.

He was part of the squad for the 2016 Summer Olympics, where Germany won the silver medal.

Honours
FC Ingolstadt
 2. Bundesliga: 2014–15

Germany
 Summer Olympic Games: Silver Medal 2016

References

External links

1996 births
Living people
People from Flensburg
German footballers
Association football midfielders
Germany youth international footballers
FC Hansa Rostock players
FC Ingolstadt 04 players
FC Ingolstadt 04 II players
Arminia Bielefeld players
SV Waldhof Mannheim players
SpVgg Greuther Fürth players
Bundesliga players
2. Bundesliga players
3. Liga players
Germany under-21 international footballers
Footballers at the 2016 Summer Olympics
Olympic footballers of Germany
Medalists at the 2016 Summer Olympics
Olympic silver medalists for Germany
Olympic medalists in football
German people of Danish descent
Footballers from Schleswig-Holstein